As of December 2018, Ernest Airlines operated to 22 destinations in 5 countries from its hub in Milan.

References 

Lists of airline destinations
Ernest Airlines